Education and Youth Development Bureau (DSEDJ) is the education agency of Macau. Its head office is in Se. It was created in 2021 to succeed the Education and Youth Affairs Bureau and the Higher Education Bureau, which merged together.

References

External links
 Education and Youth Development Bureau

Education ministries
Government departments and agencies of Macau
Education in China
2021 establishments in China
Educational institutions established in 2021